Lakshman Pinto Jayatilaka Senewiratne (born 9 March 1957) (known as Lakshman Senewiratne) is a Sri Lankan politician, former State Minister of Science, Technology and Research and a member of the Parliament of Sri Lanka representing the Badulla District. and former Cabinet Minister of Sugar Industries, His father C. P. J. Senewiratne was an MP for Mahiyangana electorate and former Cabinet Minister of Labour in the government of J.R. Jayewardene.

Lakshman was elected to parliament in the seat of Mahiyangana at a by-election on 18 April 1985, following the death of the sitting member, Lakshman's father, in December 1984. At the 1989 Sri Lankan parliamentary elections he was elected as the member for Badulla and has continuously represented the seat for 32 years.

See also
List of political families in Sri Lanka

References
 

Living people
1957 births
Sri Lankan Buddhists
Sinhalese politicians
Members of the 8th Parliament of Sri Lanka
Members of the 9th Parliament of Sri Lanka
Members of the 10th Parliament of Sri Lanka
Members of the 11th Parliament of Sri Lanka
Members of the 12th Parliament of Sri Lanka
Members of the 13th Parliament of Sri Lanka
Members of the 14th Parliament of Sri Lanka
Members of the 15th Parliament of Sri Lanka
Government ministers of Sri Lanka
United National Party politicians
United People's Freedom Alliance politicians
Ministers of state of Sri Lanka